Cynthia Farrelly Gesner is an American film actress and entertainment lawyer, known for appearing in the film Kingpin which was directed by her brothers Bobby and Peter Farrelly.

Education

Gesner graduated from Tufts University with a Bachelor of Arts degree in 1984 and went on to graduate from Boston University School of Law in 1988. She currently works in entertainment law.

Personal life
 
Gesner married former Sinbad star Zen Gesner from the television series The Adventures of Sinbad in 1997, he is also the son of actress Nan Martin, together they have 3 sons: Finn Harry Gesner (born Cape Town, South Africa), Rory Farrelly Gesner (born in Santa Monica, California), and Tuck John Gesner (born in Santa Monica, California).

Filmography
Kingpin (1996) as Silver Legacy Maid

References

External links

Living people
American film actresses
21st-century American women
Year of birth missing (living people)